Chronopolis is a science fiction short story by British writer J. G. Ballard, first published in 1960. The story begins with a man in prison, Newman, and proceeds to examine his fascination with the concept of time in a world where clocks have been prohibited and are regulated by time police.

"Chronopolis" appears in an anthology edited by Andrew Goodwyn, Science Fiction Stories.

References

1960 short stories
Time in fiction
Science fiction short stories
Short stories by J. G. Ballard
Social science fiction